Michael Svoboda (born 15 October 1998) is an Austrian professional footballer who plays as a centre-back for  club Venezia.

Club career
On 20 August 2020, he signed a 3-year contract with Italian Serie B club Venezia.

References

1998 births
Footballers from Vienna
Living people
Austrian footballers
Austrian expatriate footballers
Association football defenders
Austrian Football Bundesliga players
Serie A players
Serie B players
SK Rapid Wien players
SV Schwechat players
WSG Tirol players
Venezia F.C. players
Austrian expatriate sportspeople in Italy
Expatriate footballers in Italy
Austrian people of Ukrainian descent